Thane Direct was a home shopping teleshopping channel, airing over Sky in the United Kingdom and Ireland. The channel exclusively offered half-hour paid advertisements from direct marketing company Thane International, along with extended information through its website. It aired through Sky and Freesat, though by its end it only aired on Sky, and wound down on 5 January 2023.

References

External links
 Thane Direct homepage

Shopping networks in the United Kingdom
Defunct television channels in the United Kingdom
Infomercials
2002 establishments in the United Kingdom
2023 disestablishments in the United Kingdom
Television channels and stations established in 2002
Television channels and stations disestablished in 2023